The Federal Ministry of Defence (sometimes shortened to  or ) of Austria is the ministry in charge of all matters relating to military affairs, especially the Austrian Armed Forces. It is Austria's ministry of defence. Its current minister is Klaudia Tanner.

Authority

The minister is head of all the ministry's subordinate authorities and is the Supreme Military Commander of the Austrian Armed Forces. For certain acts, such as deployment of more than 5,000 men of the militia or reserve, the Minister for Defense's authorization is bound to the President of Austria, since in these cases the constitutional command of the army takes precedence.

Responsibilities
Specifically, the Ministry is responsible for matters regarding:

 the armed forces' constitutionally-defined duties
 the armed forces' operational and tactical leadership
 military aviation
 the provision of arms, equipment, materiel and personnel to the armed forces
 weapons, ammunition and munitions
 military technology, including weapons testing and military-technical research
 military restricted areas
 care of the armed forces' health, including military hospitals and supply of medicines
 military attachés
 the establishment, maintenance and management of all military buildings, facilities and properties owned by the state, the ministry building, the military administration or the army, including the Military History Museum, known as the 
 shipping, road transport, telecommunications and mapping in the military field
 the armed forces' finances
 the army forest at 
 management of Austria's shares in the SIVBEG as long as the federal government is a shareholder, and the regulation of that company.
 the European Defence Agency

Office holders

 Minister: Klaudia Tanner 
 Head of the Minister's Cabinet: Stefan Kammerhofer
 Chief of Staff of the Minister's Cabinet: Brigadier (1 Star General) Jürgen Ortner
 Chief of the General Staff (Head of the entire Austrian ): General Othmar Commenda
 Deputy Chief of Staff:  / Lieutenant General (3 Star General) Bernhard Bair
 Head of Section I ( or Central Section):  / Head of Section, Mr. Christian Kemperle
 Head of Section II ( or Planning):  / Lieutenant General (3 Star General) Franz Leitgeb
 Head of Section III ( or Supply):  / Lieutenant General (3 Star General) Norbert Gehart
 Head of Section IV ( or Mission):  / Lieutenant General (3 Star General) Karl Schmidseder
 Head of Section V (Sport): Samo Kobenter

Subordinate departments

Subordinate to the ministry are the:
  (Supreme Command):  / Lieutenant General (3 Star General) Franz Reißner
  (Deputy Commander):  / Major General Dieter Heidecker
  (Operations Support Command):  (1 Star General) Andreas Pernsteiner
  (Leadership Support Center):  (1 Star General) Andreas Wochner
  (Offices) :
 Armed forces personnel office:  / Councillor, Mrs. Brigitte Habermayer-Binder
 Armed forces' building and surveying office :  / Councillor Johannes Sailer
 Office for armaments and procurement:  (1 Star General) Christian Tauschitz
 Office for armaments and military technology:  (1 Star General) Michael Janisch
  (Army Intelligence Office):  / Major General Edwin Potocnik
  (Defense Agency):  / Major General Anton Oschep
 Academies:
  (National Defense Academy):  / Lieutenant General Erich Csitkovits
  (Theresa Military Academy):  / Major General Norbert Sinn
  (Army Non-Commissioned Officers' Academy):  (1 Star General) Nikolaus Egger
 Weapons training and technical schools:
  (ABC - Defense School):  / Colonel Michael Schuster
  (Army Soldiers / Troops School):  / Colonel of the General Staff, Jürgen Baranyai
  (Flight and Air Defense School):  (1 Star General) Günther Schiefert
  (Army Logistics School):  (1 Star General) Dieter Jocham
  (Leadership Support School):  / Colonel Christian Wally
  (Military Medical Centre):  (1 Star General) Eugen Gallent
  / Demining Service Department
  / Museum of Military History, Vienna: Christian Ortner

Historical development

Defense and sport were combined in the same ministry from 2009 till 2018.

Defense Ministry
Previous to 1918, there was a Ministry of War for the whole of Austria-Hungary and a Ministry of Defense solely for the Austrian half of the empire. The defence ministry took on various names during the First Austrian Republic of 1918 to 1938, and was abolished during Nazi Germany's annexation of Austria from 1938 to 1945. During the Allied occupation of Austria from 1945 to 1956, the defence agenda was in the remit of the "Office for National Defense", a section in the Federal Chancellery.

Sports Ministry
Sport first became a government portfolio in Austria in 1966, as part of the remit of the Federal Ministry of Education, which in 1984 was renamed the Federal Ministry of Education, Arts and Sports. In 1991 sport was moved to the Federal Ministry of Health, Sport and Consumer Protection, then in 1995 to the Federal Chancellery, in 2000 to the Federal Ministry of the Civil Service and Sports, in 2003 back to the Federal Chancellery and in 2009 joined the Federal Ministry of Defense and Sports. In 2018, the sports agenda was moved to the Ministry of Civil Service and Sport.

References

External links
  Official site of the Ministry
  Business division of the Ministry

Austria
Defense
Military of Austria
Government agencies established in 1956
1956 establishments in Austria
2009 establishments in Austria